A list of Martin Luther University of Halle-Wittenberg people

A 
Thomas Abbt
 Otto Ferdinand von Abensberg und Traun
 Hermann Abert
 Erasmus Alberus
 Anton Wilhelm Amo
 Nicolaus von Amsdorf
 Abraham Angermannus
 Johann Arndt
 Ludwig Achim von Arnim
 Gottfried Arnold
 Gustav Aschaffenburg
 Matthäus Aurogallus

B 
 Wilhelm Friedemann Bach
 Johann Bachstrom
 Ernst Gottfried Baldinger
 Caspar Bartholin the Elder
 Anton de Bary
 Karl Adolph von Basedow
 Emil Adolf von Behring
 August Immanuel Bekker
 Gottfried Bernhardy
 Julius Bernstein
 Willibald Beyschlag
 Jan Blahoslav
 Friedrich Blass
 Philipp August Böckh
 Julius Oscar Brefeld
 Barthold Heinrich Brockes
 Heinrich Brandt
 Theodor Brugsch
 Giordano Bruno
 Ernest I, Duke of Brunswick-Lüneburg
 August Buchner
 Johann Franz Buddeus
 Johann Christian Buxbaum

C 
Joachim Camerarius
 Johann Heinrich Callenberg
 Georg Cantor
 Martin Chemnitz
 Hermann Cohen
 Alexander Conze
 Valerius Cordus
 Caspar Cruciger the Younger
 Caspar Cruciger the Elder
 Johann Crüger

D 
 Friedrich Christoph Dahlmann
 Daniel Dahm
 Richard Walther Darré
 Friedrich Dedekind
 Christoph Demantius
 Gábor Döbrentei
 Johann Gabriel Doppelmayr
 Friedrich Ernst Dorn
 Ernst Christoph Dressler
 Ernst Dümmler
 Maximilian Wolfgang Duncker
 Kurt Diebner

E 
 Johann August Eberhard
 Martin Eichler
 Johann Sigismund Elsholtz
 Karl Elze
 Francisco de Enzinas
 Johann Eduard Erdmann
 Johann August Ernesti
 Johann Samuel Ersch
 Dorothea Erxleben

F 
Justus Falckner
 Georg Forster
 August Hermann Francke
 Georg Franck von Franckenau
 Bengt Gottfried Forselius
 Christopher Marlowe's Doctor Faustus (in fiction)

G 
 Nicolaus Gallus
 Hans Dietrich Genscher
 Scipione Gentili
 Johann Gerhard
 Paul Gerhardt
 Wilhelm Gesenius
 Heinrich Ernst Ferdinand Guericke
 Albrecht Giese
 Johann Wilhelm Ludwig Gleim
 Rudolph Goclenius
 Johann Nikolaus Götz
 Alfred Carl Graefe
 Friedrich Albrecht Carl Gren
 Johann Jakob Griesbach
 Julius Waldemar Grosse
 Johann Gottfried Gruber
 Gottlieb Sigmund Gruner
 Jan Gruter
 Simon Grynaeus
 Erich Gutenberg

H 
 Johann Habermann
 Monika Harms
 Horatio Balch Hackett
 Rudolf Haym
 Rudolf Heidenhain
 Hermann Theodor Hettner
 Friedrich Heinrich von der Hagen
 Patrick Hamilton (martyr)
 Georg Frideric Handel
 William Shakespeare’s Hamlet (in fiction)
 Gottlieb Christoph Harless
 Christian August Hausen
 Sven Hedin
 Christian Friedrich Henrici
 Gustav Ludwig Hertz
 Christian Gottlob Heyne
 Adolf Bernhard Christoph Hilgenfeld
 Ferdinand Hitzig
 Erich Hoffmann
 Anton Ludwig Ernst Horn
 Eugen Huber
 Gottlieb Hufeland
 Gustav Hugo
 Nicolaus Hunnius
 Hermann Hupfeld
 John Fletcher Hurst
 Edmund Husserl
 Leonhard Hutter

I 
 Karl Leberecht Immermann
 Nitobe Inazō

J 
 Friedrich Ludwig Jahn
 Ludwig Heinrich von Jakob
 Jeremiah Jenks
 Jan Jesenius
 Paulus Juusten

K 
 Saul Isaac Kaempf
 Andreas Karlstadt
 Karl Wilhelm Gottlob Kastner
 Bartholomäus Keckermann
 Petrus Kenicius
 Karl-Hermann Knoblauch
 Ernst Kohlschütter

L 
Heinrich Laube
 Johann Gottlob Lehmann
 Heinrich Leo
 Edwin Linkomies
 Christian Lobeck
 Otto Heinrich von Löben
 Johann Carl Gottfried Loewe
 Valentin Ernst Löscher
 Karl August Lossen
 Gottfried Christian Friedrich Lücke
 Martin Luther
 Paul Luther
 Cyprián Karásek Lvovický of Lvovice

M 
Lucas Maius
 Johann Friedrich Meckel
 Johann David Michaelis
 Gustav Mie
 Friedrich de la Motte Fouqué
 Friedrich Mohs
 Joachim Mrugowsky (1905–1948), Nazi doctor executed for war crimes
 Julius Müller
 Lucian Müller
 Frederick Muhlenberg
 Henry Muhlenberg

N 
 Johann August Nauck
 August Neander
 Michael Neander
 Felix von Niemeyer
 Benedikt Niese
 Karl Immanuel Nitzsch

O 
 Adam Gottlob Oehlenschläger

P 
 Peter Simon Pallas
 Simon Patten
 Christiaan Hendrik Persoon
 Jöran Persson
 Olaus Petri
 Caspar Peucer
 Julius Plücker
 August Pott
 Johannes Praetorius
 Edmond de Pressensé
 Robert Prutz

Q 
Johannes Andreas Quenstedt

R 
 Karl Wilhelm Ramler
 Werner Rauh
 Friedrich Ludwig Georg von Raumer
 Ernst Raupach
 Hermann Samuel Reimarus
 Erasmus Reinhold
 Johann Jakob Reiske
 Julius Reubke
 Edouard Guillaume Eugène Reuss
 Peter Riedel
 Eduard Karl August Riehm
 Albrecht Ritschl
 Lars Roberg
 Johann Karl Friedrich Rosenkranz
 David Ruhnken

S 
Friedrich Carl von Savigny
 Nikolaus Selnecker
 Johann Andreas Segner
 Johann Salomo Semler
 Daniel Sennert
 Philip Schaff
 Max Scheler
 Valentin Schindler
 Diederich Franz Leonhard von Schlechtendal
 Friedrich Daniel Ernst Schleiermacher
 August Ludwig von Schlözer
 Franz Hermann Schulze-Delitzsch
 Max Schultze
 Karl Schwarz
 Veit Ludwig von Seckendorff
 George Spalatin
 Philipp Jakob Spener
 Oswald Spengler
 Walther Spielmeyer
 Curt Polycarp Joachim Sprengel
 Georg Ernst Stahl
 Hermann Staudinger
 Emmanuel Steinschneider
 Henrik Steffens
 Martin Stephan
 Rudolf Ewald Stier
 Count Friedrich Leopold zu Stolberg
 Johann Friedrich Struensee
 Aleksandras Stulginskis
 Carl Stumpf
 Annette Schmiedchen
 Stuart Parkin

T 
 Friedrich Tholuck
 Christian Thomasius
 Ludwig Tieck
 Jiří Třanovský
 Daniel Gottlob Türk

U 
 Hermann Ulrici
 Dimitri Uznadze

V 
Karl August Varnhagen von Ense
 Abraham Vater
 Daniel Vorländer
 Hugo Marie de Vries

W 
 Wilhelm Eduard Weber
 Julius Wegscheider
 Hermann Welcker
 Julius Wellhausen
 Joachim Westphal (of Hamburg)
 Albert Wigand (meteorologist)
 Carl Ludwig Willdenow
 Johann Joachim Winckelmann
 Friedrich August Wolf
 Christian Wolff (philosopher)
 F. C. D. Wyneken

Z 
Paul Zarifopol
 Caspar Ziegler
 Karl Ziegler
 Nicolaus Ludwig Zinzendorf
 Max Zorn
 Leopold Zunz.

Martin Luther University of Halle-Wittenberg
Martin Luther University